The Italian general election of 1987 took place on 14 June 1987.

In Veneto Christian Democracy was, as usual, the largest party that got 43.5% of the vote.

Results

Chamber of Deputies
Source: Regional Council of Veneto

Provincial breakdown
Source: Regional Council of Veneto

Senate
Source: Regional Council of Veneto

Elections in Veneto
General, Veneto